Theaflavin (TF) and its derivatives, known collectively as theaflavins, are antioxidant polyphenols that are formed from the condensation of flavan-3-ols in tea leaves during the enzymatic oxidation (sometimes erroneously referred to as fermentation) of black tea. Theaflavin-3-gallate, theaflavin-3'-gallate, and theaflavin-3-3'-digallate are the main theaflavins. Theaflavins are types of thearubigins, and are therefore reddish in color.

See also 
 Theaflavin 3-gallate

References 

Phenol antioxidants
Cancer research
Antiviral drugs
Thearubigins
Catechols
Resorcinols
Tropolones